Larry Ray Scott (born March 24, 1952) is an American businessman, engineer, and politician serving as a member of the New Mexico House of Representatives.

Early life and education
Scott was born on March 24, 1952, in Hobbs, New Mexico. He attended the University of Texas at Austin, earning a Bachelor of Science degree in electrical engineering.

Career
Prior to entering politics, Scott worked as an engineer and was the president of Lynx Petroleum Consultants, an oil and gas company based in Hobbs, New Mexico. Scott is the member of the Republican Party.

SInce his election in 2014, Scott has not faced an opponent for re-election. In 2020, Scott opposed an economic recovery bill, criticizing the state's decision to shut down the economy during the COVID-19 pandemic.

References 

Living people
1952 births
Republican Party members of the New Mexico House of Representatives
21st-century American politicians
University of Texas at Austin alumni